Bijalpur is in the south-west region of Indore city. It has population of 40,000 (as per Census record 2011).

 India census, Bijalpur had a population of 18000. Males constitute 51% of the population and females 49%. Bijalpur has an average literacy rate of 83%, higher than the national average of 59.5%: male literacy is 89%, and female literacy is 74%. In Bijalpur, 16% of the population is under 6 years of age.

History  

Bijalpur is known for its natural environment and farming community. The Kabaddi team in Bijalpur has won many championships, and the city played host to the all India Kabbadi tournament in 1991.

Geography

Climate is sub tropical which is typical in this part of country. Summers are hot and dry followed by monsoon months, with approximate  of rainfall followed by mild winters in the months of Dec-Jan.
It has Government women polytechnic college situated on Bijalpur square. It also has schools and colleges attached to Devi Ahilya Vishwavidyalaya and RGPV in its vicinity. There is a water control flow room in Bijalpur.

Politics
Bijalpur area falls under the Rau Assembly Constituency in Indore District. The current elected Member is Jitu Patwari from the Congress.

Transport
Bijalpur is situated near the AB Road (NH 52) and has got a frequent connection of city buses from the main Bijalpur Square.

The nearest broad gauge railway station is Rajendra Nagar railway station. Indore Jn is one of the major stations and has regular daily connections to almost all major cities in the country.

Places of interest
Bijalpur Lake: Also houses the sewage treatment plant.

References

Suburbs of Indore
Neighbourhoods in Indore